is a Japanese actor, who began his acting career as Renn Kōsaka/Go-On Blue in the 2008 tokusatsu series Engine Sentai Go-onger.  He is currently featured in television advertisements for Takara Tomy's children's game Kurohige Kiki Ippatsu (Pop-up Pirate).

Filmography

Drama television 
 Boys Esté (TV Tokyo, 2007)
 Engine Sentai Go-onger (TV Asahi, 2008 - 2009) - Renn Kousaka / Go-on Blue
 Kaoruko - Empress of the Night ( Jotei Kaoruko ) ([TV Asahi], 2010) - Minoru Yoshikawa 
Kokuhatsu~Kokusen Bengonin(TV Asahi,2011)- bartender
 Nakase no Onna (TV Asahi,2011)eps.1- Ryuichi 
 Sengoku Danshi (TV Yokohama,2011) - Sadatsuna Oouchi

Films 
 Juken no Cinderella (2008)
 Engine Sentai Go-onger: Boom Boom! Bang Bang! GekijōBang!! (Toei, 2008) - Renn Kousaka / Go-on Blue
 Engine Sentai Go-onger vs. Gekiranger (Toei, 2009) - Renn Kousaka / Go-on Blue
 Gakkou Ura-Site (2009) - Shin'ichiro Kamiya
 Slackers: Kizudarake no Yuujou (December 2009) - Shigeru Nihei
 Kemuri wo meguru Bouken (2010) - Nobuyuki Kiyasu
 Samurai Sentai Shinkenger vs. Go-onger: GinmakuBang!! (Toei, 2010) - Renn Kousaka / Go-on Blue
 Hard Life(2011)
Ano Sora no Ao(2012) - Ayumu Tono
 Go-Onger:10 Years after GrandPrix (2018)/Go-on Blue

CM 
 Goodwill: Mobaito dot Com (2006)
 Takara Tomy: Pop-up Pirate (2009)
 Kao (2009)

DVD 
 Engine Sentai Go-onger: Bon Bon! Bon Bon! Net de Bong!! (2008) - Renn Kousaka / Go-on Blue
 DVD Spesial di Engine Sentai Go-onger: It's a Seminar! Everyone GO-ON!! (2008) - Renn Kousaka / Go-on Blue
 Engine Sentai Go-onger vs. Gekiranger (Toei, 2009) - Renn Kousaka / Go-on Blue

Theatre 
 Back Stage (versi teater) (2009)
 Boku wa, Kimi no tame ni koso Shi ni niiku (2009)
 Sengoku Basara (versi teater) (2009) - Sanada Yukimura
 Musikal Nintama Rantaro (2010) - Tomesaburo Kema

PV 
 May: "Sarai no Kaze" (2007)
 Tee with Crystal Kay: "Answer" (2012)

Other media

TV Commercials
 Tomy Takara
goodwill

External links
His official blog: http://ameblo.jp/shinwakataoka

Living people
1985 births